The Basketball Bundesliga 2009–10 was the 44th season of the Basketball Bundesliga. Ten days before the start of the season, Beko was presented as the new main sponsor of the BBL. The sponsorship agreement was made for a period of six years and included a rebranding of the league name to Beko BBL. After topsy-turvy playoffs that saw all of the top four teams in the regular season defeated in the first round, Brose Baskets Bamberg won the title after a 5-game final series against the Skyliners Frankfurt, who had defeated another higher seed in the semifinals. It was the 3rd title for Bamberg, who were also the only higher-seeded team to win a playoff series this season.

Teams
Giants Nördlingen have decided to withdraw from the Basketball Bundesliga (BBL) and play in the Pro A this season. This resulted in a wild card to be issued by the BBL. The wild card was granted to LTi Giessen 46ers. LTi Giessen 46ers finished on a relegation position the previous season. Mitteldeutscher BC and Phoenix Hagen of the Pro A division have qualified by sportive means to play in Basketball Bundesliga 2009–10. Both received a licence for this season. Phoenix Hagen still has to meet a deadline by 30 July 2009 regarding their arena to maintain the licence, however the BBL expects them to meet the requirements. On 10 July 2009  Köln 99ers have filed for insolvency. On Monday 20 July 2009 he BBL intended to decide and announce its reaction to this insolvency. However, on Friday 17 July 2009 Köln 99ers declared to renounce their BBL licence.  The created free space resulted in a second wild card being issued to Eisbären Bremerhaven. Eisbären Bremerhaven finished last in the previous season and originally were to be relegated.

PO: Playoff; Rel: Relegation; Pro A: Division below BBL

Main round standings

Playoffs

See also
 Basketball Bundesliga 2008–09
 Basketball Bundesliga 2010–11
 German champions

References

External links
German League official website 
BBL main round results  

Basketball Bundesliga seasons
German
1